Kosta Papić (born 17 July 1960) is a Serbian football coach who has managed a number of great African clubs in South Africa, Ghana, Nigeria and Tanzania.

Coaching career
Previous clubs: Kaizer Chiefs, Maritzburg United, Orlando Pirates (all South Africa); Lobi Stars, Enyimba, Enugu Rangers, Kwara United (all Nigeria)

In December 2008, Kosta Papić moved to Ghana and coached Accra Hearts of Oak SC and left the club on mutual consent after leading with 10 points and 7 games to finish the season due to what he termed managerial interference. He worked last as head coach by Accra Hearts of Oak SC up to July 2009.  He is currently signed as head coach of Young Africans FC under a 2-year contract.

Kostadin Papić arrived in Dar es Salaam ready for his new job at Yanga football club. One of the coach's earliest experiences in his new setting will be the match against traditional rivals Simba on 31 October.

He then managed Royal Eagles.

He became manager of the eSwatini national team in December 2018. He left the role in December 2019.

References

External links
Kosta Papić at Footballdatabase

1960 births
Living people
Sportspeople from Novi Sad
Serbian football managers

Lobi Stars F.C. managers
Enyimba F.C. managers
Rangers International F.C. managers
Kwara United F.C. managers
Orlando Pirates F.C. managers
Maritzburg United F.C. managers
Kaizer Chiefs F.C. managers
Accra Hearts of Oak S.C. managers
Young Africans S.C. managers
Black Leopards F.C. managers
Chippa United F.C. managers
Polokwane City F.C. managers
Eswatini national football team managers

Nigeria Professional Football League managers
Premier Soccer League managers
Ghana Premier League managers
Ethiopian Premier League managers

Serbian expatriate football managers
Expatriate football managers in Nigeria
Expatriate soccer managers in South Africa
Expatriate football managers in Ghana
Expatriate football managers in Tanzania
Expatriate football managers in Ethiopia
Serbian expatriate sportspeople in Nigeria
Serbian expatriate sportspeople in Ghana
Serbian expatriate sportspeople in South Africa
Serbian expatriate sportspeople in Tanzania
Serbian expatriate sportspeople in Ethiopia
Serbian expatriate sportspeople in Eswatini
Expatriate football managers in Eswatini